The Bachelor of Asian Studies (B.As.) is a bachelor's degree for asian studies. B.As. courses take 3 or 4 years.

Bachelor of Asian Studies courses often require students to study one Asian language in-depth, such as Arabic, Chinese, Hindi, Indonesian, Japanese, Korean, Thai, Lao, Urdu, Persian, or Vietnamese.

B.As. graduates will generally receive a grounding in one or more aspects of Asia, such as Asian history, Asian politics and international relations, and/or Asian religion.

They may also be required to study one Asian culture to an advanced level.

References 

Asian studies
Asian Studies